Showq-e Olya (also Romanized as Showq-e ‘Olyā; also known as Shogh Olya, Showq-e Bālā) is a village in Pariz Rural District, Pariz District, Sirjan County, Kerman Province, Iran. At the 2006 census, its population was 45, in 10 families.

References 

Populated places in Sirjan County